The Mamariga shuttle is an automated funicular railway that links the Bilbao metro station at Santurtzi  (on line 2) with the neighborhood of Mamariga; both in the municipality of Santurtzi, in the Greater Bilbao area.

History 
The construction of an access from Santurtzi metro station to the neighborhood of Mamariga wasn't included in the original planning for Line 2. The construction  of the funicular started in late 2007. The shuttle opened in September 2010, more than a year after the metro station. In June 2015, the Mamariga terminus of the funicular was severely damaged by a fire. The shuttle reopened in December that year after repairs were carried out.

Operations 
The Mamariga terminus is not considered a distinct metro station, but rather an access to Santurtzi station. Since 2013, no fare has been charged for using the funicular. The operating hours of the shuttle are the same as those of the metro. On the funicular, trains depart approximately every 3 minutes.

In its  length, the funicular ascends . The line is double tracked, with each track being operated independently of the other.

References 

Funicular railways in Spain
Bilbao metro
2010 establishments in Spain
Railway lines opened in 2010